Hanging of Judas may refer to:
The death of Judas Iscariot as related by the Gospel of Matthew
A ritual related to the burning of Judas that is practiced in some cultures near Easter

Judas Iscariot